Hawk's Tor is a hill and tor on Bodmin Moor in Cornwall, England, UK.

The slopes of the tor contain Hawkstor Downs, the Stripple stones, a stone circle and Hawkstor Pit, which is a Site of Special Scientific Interest noted for its biological interest.

There is another Hawk's Tor (329 m) on Bodmin Moor, further east, near the village of North Hill.

References

Hills of Cornwall
Bodmin Moor
Sites of Special Scientific Interest in Cornwall